The following is a list of radio stations in Slovenia. The following list sorts radio stations, broadcast in Slovenia by regions of coverage and broadcast type of programming. The list does not include web-only, cable-only and DAB+-only radio stations.

Radio stations with national coverage

Public radio stations of Radiotelevizija Slovenija

Private radio stations

Non-profit radio stations

Radio stations with regional and local coverage

Regional studios of Radiotelevizija Slovenija

Minority radio stations of Radiotelevizija Slovenija

College radio stations

Regional radio stations with special status

Local radio stations with special status

Regional and local radio with special status

Regional and local radio stations without special status

Private radio stations

Radio stations no longer on air

References
 AKOS, 2022
 Webpages of Slovenian radio stations
 FMSCAN.org

External links
 RADIO.RTV.SI: Lestvica slovenskih radijskih postaj 
 Radiostanica.com: Slovenačke radio stanice uživo preko interneta! 

 
Slovenia
Radio stations